Victor Ivan Lynn (January 26, 1925 – December 6, 2010) was a Canadian professional ice hockey player. He played in the National Hockey League (NHL) from 1943 to 1954. He is notable as the only player in NHL history to play for all of the Original Six teams.

Professional career
During the 1942–43 season Lynn played one game for the New York Rangers, on February 28, 1943 against the Detroit Red Wings.

In 1944, he joined the Detroit Red Wings' organization but was sent to play for the Indianapolis Capitals of the AHL.

Several years later, after Lynn had been released not only by the Wings, but the Montreal Canadiens as well, and he joined Buffalo of the AHL. While there he signed with the Toronto Maple Leafs. 

In Toronto, Lynn joined Howie Meeker and Ted Kennedy to form "The K-L-M Line." The trio played for three seasons, and helped the Maple Leafs win the Stanley Cup in 1947, 1948 and 1949.

On November 16, 1950, Lynn was traded to the Boston Bruins with Bill Ezinicki for Fernie Flaman, Leo Boivin, Ken Smith and Phil Maloney, where he played for a short time before heading to the minors with the Cleveland Barons of the AHL. Then, in 1953, he played one final time in the NHL, with the Chicago Black Hawks where he played his final NHL games near the end of the year. His career statistics included 49 goals and 76 assists for 125 points in 327 games. He also registered 274 penalty minutes.

Coaching career
Lynn was the head coach of the Prince Albert Mintos of the SJHL in 1958–59  and of the  Saskatoon Quakers of the SSHL in 1962–63.

Career statistics

Regular season and playoffs

References

External links

Picture of Vic Lynn's Name on the 1949 Stanley Cup Plaque
Vic Lynn's obituary

1925 births
2010 deaths
Boston Bruins players
Brandon Regals players
Buffalo Bisons (AHL) players
Canadian ice hockey left wingers
Canadian expatriate ice hockey players in the United States
Chicago Blackhawks players
Cleveland Barons (1937–1973) players
Detroit Red Wings players
Ice hockey people from Saskatchewan
Montreal Canadiens players
New York Rangers players
New York Rovers players
Ontario Hockey Association Senior A League (1890–1979) players
Pittsburgh Hornets players
Providence Reds players
Saskatoon Quakers players
Saskatoon Regals/St. Paul Saints players
St. Louis Flyers players
Sportspeople from Saskatoon
Stanley Cup champions
Toronto Maple Leafs players